Kindersley is a former provincial electoral district for the Legislative Assembly of the province of Saskatchewan, Canada. This constituency was created before the 3rd Saskatchewan general election in 1912. The district was dissolved and combined with the Kerrobert riding (as Kerrobert-Kindersley) before the 9th Saskatchewan general election in 1938.

It is now part of the present-day Kindersley constituency.

Members of the Legislative Assembly

Election results

|-

 
|Conservative
|James Melvin Toombs
|align="right"|915
|align="right"|47.68%
|align="right"|–
|- bgcolor="white"
!align="left" colspan=3|Total
!align="right"|1,919
!align="right"|100.00%
!align="right"|

|-

 
|Conservative
|Edward George Walker
|align="right"|2,338
|align="right"|47.39%
|align="right"|-0.29
|- bgcolor="white"
!align="left" colspan=3|Total
!align="right"|4,933
!align="right"|100.00%
!align="right"|

|- bgcolor="white"
!align="left" colspan=3|Total
!align="right"|Acclaimation

|-

|- bgcolor="white"
!align="left" colspan=3|Total
!align="right"|4,199
!align="right"|100.00%
!align="right"|

|-

|- bgcolor="white"
!align="left" colspan=3|Total
!align="right"|3,877
!align="right"|100.00%
!align="right"|

|-

|- bgcolor="white"
!align="left" colspan=3|Total
!align="right"|5,866
!align="right"|100.00%
!align="right"|

 
|Conservative
|Robert Henry Carruthers
|align="right"|1,615
|align="right"|23.81%
|align="right"|-
|- bgcolor="white"
!align="left" colspan=3|Total
!align="right"|6,782
!align="right"|100.00%
!align="right"|

See also 
Electoral district (Canada)
List of Saskatchewan provincial electoral districts
List of Saskatchewan general elections
List of political parties in Saskatchewan

References 
 Saskatchewan Archives Board – Saskatchewan Election Results By Electoral Division

Former provincial electoral districts of Saskatchewan